The Gidrán is a family of Hungarian armoured tactical vehicles, based on the Turkish Ejder Yalçın vehicles by Nurol Makina.

History

Development
The development of the Gidrán platform by a new Hungarian joint venture was announced on December 21, 2020 in Budapest. According to the press release, the new company was founded by the Hungarian firm HT Division Zrt., a licensee of Nurol Makina, and Rheinmetall Hungary Zrt., itself a joint venture between Germany's Rheinmetall Defence and the Government of Hungary. The primary user of the Gidrán will be the Hungarian Defence Forces.

The first 50 vehicles are being built in Turkey as standard Ejder Yalçın 4×4, with the initial batch of 10 vehicles having been delivered and entered Hungarian service in December 2020.

Later vehicles will be designed in Rheinmetall Hungary's new development and manufacturing center in Zalaegerszeg, the same plant where the Lynx KF41HU tracked  infantry fighting vehicles are also being developed. The first locally developed prototypes are expected to enter testing in 2021 and manufacturing will start at a new plant near Kaposvár.

Description
The Hungarian vehicles technically constitute a 4th generation Ejder Yalçin with specific modifications for the Hungarian Defence Forces including LED lighting and improved ergonomics. 
Examples already delivered by Nurol Makina are fitted with an auxiliary power unit on the rear left of the vehicle, as well as Aselsan’s Stabilised Advanced Remote Weapon Platform (SARP) featuring SEDA directional gunshot detection system.

Operators 

 : The Hungarian Army is expected to receive 300+ Gidrans. On February 9, 2021 the first 10 fully integrated Gidran 4x4 vehicles were delivered to the 25th Infantry Brigade "György Klapka" in Tata.

See also 
 Ejder Yalçın 4×4

References

External links 
 

Rheinmetall
Wheeled armoured fighting vehicles
Armoured fighting vehicles of Hungary
Armoured fighting vehicles of the post–Cold War period